Cooper-Bessemer refers to the Cooper-Bessemer Corporation and the Cooper-Bessemer brand of industrial engines and compressors, manufactured in Mount Vernon, Ohio. The Cooper-Bessemer Corporation was formed when C. & G. Cooper (founded in 1833) and the Bessemer Gas Engine Company (founded in 1899) merged in 1929. In 1965, the company was renamed to Cooper Industries and relocated to Houston, Texas. In the 1990s, Cooper Industries' Petroleum and Industrial Equipment Group was spun off to become Cooper Cameron Corporation, known as the Compression Systems group of Cameron International Corporation. Cooper Machinery Services is the current original equipment manufacturer for Cooper-Bessemer engines.

Products

Engines
In 1929, Cooper-Bessemer products included gas engine-driven compressors, stationary and marine diesel engines and gas engines. During World War II, Cooper-Bessemer contributed heavily to the war effort by manufacturing diesel engines for troop and cargo ships as well as warships, tugboats, rescue, and patrol boats. Cooper-Bessemer gas engines were widely used in the production of rubber, alloys, light metals, high-octane aircraft fuel, synthetic ammonia for munitions, and in refineries, chemical plants, shipyards and petroleum pipelines. Many early GE diesel locomotives had Cooper Bessemer engines.

Compressors
From the 1920s to the 1980s, the company manufactured thousands of Cooper-Bessemer integral engine-compressors, including the GMV, GMW and GMX series, and the V-250, V-275, W-330, Z-330 and QUAD compressors. These compressors used a "compact, V-angle engine design with an articulated connecting rod arrangement, allowing power piston connecting rods to drive onto one master compressor rod for each throw of the crankshaft." "The GMV integral-angle gas engine-compressor was a major contributor to the world’s economy for more than a half century, providing compression energy for the natural gas transmission, gas treatment, petrochemical, refinery and power industries in the United States and forty-four countries around the world."

Current ownership
Thousands of Cooper-Bessemer engines continue to operate today. GE bought over this product from Cameron in 2014. Cooper Machinery Services is the current original equipment manufacturer for Cooper-Bessemer engines.

References

External links
 Cooper Machinery Services - Cooper-Bessemer

American companies established in 1833
Manufacturing companies based in Ohio
Manufacturing companies established in 1833